Harpreet  may refer to

 Harpreet Sawhney, engineer
 Harpreet Sandhu (actor), actor and filmmaker
 Harpreet Sandhu (politician), Indian American politician and community activist
 Harpreet Singh (sport shooter), Indian pistol shooter
 Harpreet Singh (boxer) (born 1979), Indian boxer
 Harpreet Singh (carrom player), state carrom champion of Punjab, India
 Harpreet Singh Giani, Indian Advocate and Barrister
Harpreet Singh (footballer, born 1982), Indian football player
Harpreet Singh (footballer, born 2002), Indian football player
 Harpreet Singh Bhatia (born 1991), Indian cricketer
 Harpreet Singh (cricketer, born 1967) (born 1967), Indian cricketer

Indian feminine given names
Indian masculine given names